The Oriental Club in London is an exclusive  Private Members’ Club established in 1824  Charles Graves describes it as fine in quality as White's but with the space of infinitely larger  clubs. It is located in Stratford Place, near Oxford Street and Bond Street.

Foundation
The Asiatic Journal and Monthly Miscellany reported in its April 1824, issue:

The founders included the Duke of Wellington and General Sir John Malcolm, and in 1824 all the Presidencies and Provinces of British India were still controlled by the Honourable East India Company.

History and membership
The early years of the club, from 1824 to 1858, are detailed in a book by Stephen Wheeler published in 1925, which contains a paragraph on each member of the club of that period.

James Grant said of the club in The Great Metropolis (1837):

The old Smoking Room is adorned with an elaborate ram's head snuff box complete with snuff rake and spoons, though most members have forgotten its original function.

On 29 July 1844, two heroes of the First Anglo-Afghan War, Sir William Nott and Sir Robert Sale, were elected as members of the club by the Committee as an "extraordinary tribute of respect and anticipating the unanimous sentiment of the Club".

On 12 January 1846, a special meeting at the club in Hanover Square presided over by George Eden, 1st Earl of Auckland, a former Governor-General of India, paid a public tribute to the dying Charles Metcalfe, 1st Baron Metcalfe, which Sir James Weir Hogg described as "a wreath upon his bier".

With the formation of the East India Club in 1849, the link with the Honourable East India Company began to decline.

In 1850, Peter Cunningham wrote in his Hand-Book of London:

In 1861, the club's Chef de cuisine, Richard Terry, published his book Indian Cookery, stating that his recipes were "gathered, not only from my own knowledge of cookery, but from Native Cooks".

Charles Dickens Jr. reported in Dickens's Dictionary of London (1879): Dickens appears to have been quoting the club's own Rules and Regulations; that phrase appears there in 1889, when the total number of members was limited to eight hundred.

When Lytton Strachey joined the club in 1922, at the age of forty-two, he wrote to Virginia Woolf

Stephen Wheeler's 1925 book Annals of the Oriental Club, 1824–1858 also contains a list of the members of the club in the year 1924, with their years of election and their places of residence.

In 1927, R. A. Rye wrote of the club's library – "The library of the Oriental Club ... contains about 4,700 volumes, mostly on oriental subjects", while in 1928 Louis Napoleon Parker mentioned in his autobiography "... the bald and venerable heads of the members of the Oriental Club, perpetually reading The Morning Post.

In 1934, the novelist Alec Waugh wrote of

Another writer recalling the club in the 1970s says:

Club houses

In its monthly issue for June 1824, The Asiatic Journal reported that "The Oriental Club expect to open their house, No. 16, Lower Grosvenor Street, early in June. The Members, in the mean time, are requested to send their names to the Secretary as above, and to pay their admission fee and first year's subscription to the bankers, Messrs Martin, Call and Co., Bond Street."

The club's first purpose-built club house, in Hanover Square, was constructed in 1827–1828 and designed by Philip Wyatt and his brother Benjamin Dean Wyatt. The construction of additions to the Clubhouse that were designed by Decimus Burton, in 1853, was superintended, when eventually commenced, in 1871, by his nephew Henry Marley Burton.

Edward Walford, in his Old and New London (Volume 4, 1878) wrote of this building

The club remained in Hanover Square until 1961. The club house there was in use for the last time on 30 November 1961. Early in 1962, the club moved into its present club house, Stratford House in Stratford Place, just off Oxford Street, London W1C, having bought the property for conversion in 1960.

The central range of Stratford House was designed by Robert Adam and was built between 1770 and 1776 for Edward Stratford, 2nd Earl of Aldborough, who paid £4,000 for the site. It had previously been the location of the Lord Mayor of London's Banqueting House, built in 1565. The house remained in the Stratford family until 1832. It belonged briefly to Grand Duke Nicholas Nikolaevich, a son of Tsar Nicholas I of Russia. The house was little altered until 1894, when its then owner, Murray Guthrie, added a second storey to the east and west wings and a colonnade in front. In 1903, a new owner, the Liberal politician Sir Edward Colebrook, later Lord Colebrooke, reconstructed the Library to an Adam design. In 1908, Lord Derby bought a lease and began more alterations, removing the colonnade and adding a third storey to both wings. He took out the original bifurcated staircase (replacing it with a less elegant single one), demolished the stables and built a Banqueting Hall with a grand ballroom above.

In 1960, the Club began to convert its new property. The ballroom was turned into two floors of new bedrooms, further lifts were added, and the banqueting hall was divided into a dining room and other rooms. The club now has a main drawing room, as well as others, a members' bar, a library and an ante-room, a billiards room, an internet suite and business room, and two (non)smoking rooms, as well as a dining room and 32 bedrooms.

Stratford House is a Grade I listed building.

The flag flying above the club house bears an Indian elephant, which is the badge of the club.

Art collection
The club possesses a fine collection of paintings, including many early portraits of Britons in India such as Warren Hastings. The Bar is overlooked by a painting of Tippu Sultan, the Tiger of Mysore (1750–1799). There are portraits of the club's principal founders, the first Duke of Wellington (by H. W. Pickersgill) and Sir John Malcolm (by Samuel Lane). Other portraits include Lord Cornwallis (1738–1805), also by Samuel Lane, Sir Jamsetjee Jeejebhoy, 1st Baronet (1783–1859), by John Smart, Clive of India (1725–1774) by Nathaniel Dance-Holland, Major-General Stringer Lawrence by Sir Joshua Reynolds, Major General Sir Thomas Munro, 1st Baronet (1761–1827), by Ramsay Richard Reinagle, Edward Stratford, second Earl of Aldborough (died 1801) by Mather Brown, Mehemet Ali, Pasha of Egypt (c. 1769–1849) and General Sir William Nott, both by Thomas Brigstocke, Henry Petty-Fitzmaurice, 5th Marquess of Lansdowne (1845–1927) by Sydney P. Kenrick after John Singer Sargent, Lieutenant-General Sir Richard Strachey (1817–1908) by Lowes Dickinson (the bequest of his widow, Jane Maria Strachey), Charles Metcalfe, 1st Baron Metcalfe by F. R. Say, Thomas Snodgrass by an unknown artist, and a bust of the first Lord Lake.

President of the Club

1824–1852: Arthur Wellesley, 1st Duke of Wellington (Honorary President)

After Wellington's death in 1852, no further Presidents were appointed.

Chairmen of the Committee
1837: Sir Pulteney Malcolm GCB RN (brother of the founder, Sir John Malcolm)
1843: Major-General Sir J. L. Lushington
1918: C. A. MacDonald
1932–1933: Sir Reginald Mant
1951: Sir Charles Innes (Governor of Burma, 1927–1932)
1954 and 1958–1962: Sir Arthur Bruce

Founding Committee
The first club Committee of 1824 included:

Lord William Bentinck GCB (1774–1839)
Charles Williams-Wynn MP (1775–1850)
General Sir Alured Clarke GCB (1744–1832)
General Sir George Nugent, Bt GCB (1757–1849)
Vice-Admiral Sir Richard King, Bt (1774–1834)
Vice-Admiral Sir Pulteney Malcolm KCB (1768–1838)
Major General Sir John Malcolm GCB KLS (1769–1833)
Sir George Staunton, Bt. MP (1781–1859)
Sir Charles Forbes, 1st Baronet MP
Lt General Sir Thomas Hislop Bart GCB
Lt General Sir Miles Nightingall, KCB
Major General Sir Patrick Rose
Sir Robert Farquhar, Bt.
Sir Christopher Cole KCB MP
Major General Malcolm Grant
Major General Haldane, CB
Rear Admiral Lamber
Major General Rumley
Colonel Baron Tuyll
Colonel Alston
Colonel Baillie MP
Alexander Boswell, Esq.

Notable members
William Beresford, 1st Viscount Beresford (1768–1854)
Sir Hudson Lowe GCMG (1769–1844)
Vice-Admiral Sir Henry Blackwood, 1st Baronet (1770–1832)
Mountstuart Elphinstone (1779–1859), Governor of Bombay and author
Sir William Nott (1782–1845), distinguished soldier of the First Anglo-Afghan War, by special election
Sir Robert Sale (1782–1845), another hero of the First Anglo-Afghan War, by special election
George Eden, 1st Earl of Auckland (1784–1849), Governor-General of India 1835–1842
Pownoll Pellew, 2nd Viscount Exmouth (1786–1833)
George FitzClarence, 1st Earl of Munster (1794–1842), son of King William IV
Alfred Burton (1802 - 1877). Mayor of Hastings, and son of the pre-eminent property developer James Burton. Alfred Burton was a long-standing member of the club, to which he donated numerous books and pictures, and to which his brother Decimus Burton and nephew Henry Marley Burton made architectural additions 
Mansur Ali Khan, Nawab of Bengal (1830–1884)
The 1st Earl of Inchcape (1852–1932)
Sir Archibald Birkmyre, 1st Baronet (1875–1935)
Sir Narayana Raghavan Pillai of Elenkath, KCIE, CBE, ICS Former Governor of the Bank of India & Secretary of State; grandson of Dewan Nanoo Pillai of Elenkath
Sir John Jardine Paterson (1920–2000), Calcutta businessman
Austen Kark (1926–2002), managing director of the BBC World Service
 The Earl of Cromer (born 1946) of the Barings banking family 
The 8th Earl of Wilton of the Grosvenor family (See Duke of Westminster)
The 3rd Lord Wrenbury
The 3rd Lord Shepherd
The Earl of Derby (born 1962)
The 4th Earl of Inchcape (born 1943)
Simon Mackay, Baron Tanlaw (born 1934)
Keichi Hayashi, Representative of the Emperor of Japan
Ravi Kumar, Pillai of Kandamath. Indian aristocrat
Maharaja Jai Singh
Sir David Tang, KBE, Hong Kong and London businessman
William Charles Langdon Brown, CBE, banker and former Member of the Hong Kong Legislative Council 
Sir Mark Tully (born 1936) former Chief of Bureau, BBC, New Delhi
Sir George Martin (born 1926), producer of The Beatles
Christopher Beazley MEP (born 1952)
Alan Duncan MP
David Davies MP
Richard Harrington MP
James Innes (born 1975), British author
Swapan Dasgupta Indian MP and journalist

Members in fiction
Early in William Makepeace Thackeray's novel Vanity Fair (1848), Thackeray says of Joseph Sedley that "...he dined at fashionable taverns (for the Oriental Club was not as yet invented)." By the time of Sedley's return from India in 1827, "His very first point, of course, was to become a member of the Oriental Club, where he spent his mornings in the company of his brother Indians, where he dined, or whence he brought home men to dine."
In Thackeray's The Newcomes (1855), Colonel Thomas Newcome and Binnie are members of the Oriental Club. Writing of Thackeray, Francis Evans Baily says "...the Anglo-Indian types in his novels, including Colonel Newcome, were drawn from members of the Oriental Club in Hanover Square".

Bibliography
Baillie, Alexander F., The Oriental Club and Hanover Square (London, Longman, Green, 1901, 290 pp, illustrated)
Wheeler, Stephen (ed.), Annals of the Oriental Club, 1824–1858 (London, The Arden Press, 1925, xvi + 201 pp)
Forrest, Denys Mostyn, The Oriental: Life Story of a West End Club (London, Batsford, 1968, 240 pp)
Riches, Hugh A History of the Oriental Club (London, Oriental Club, 1998)

See also
List of London's gentlemen's clubs

References

External links
The Oriental Club – official web site
The Association of London Clubs – official web site
Listed Buildings in Stratford Place, Westminster – at westminster.gov.uk (official web site of the City of Westminster)

Gentlemen's clubs in London
Grade I listed buildings in the City of Westminster
Grade I listed clubhouses
1824 establishments in England
Military gentlemen's clubs